Aron Hirsch (6 February 1858 – 22 February 1942) was a German metal trader.

Biography
Hirsch was born to a Jewish family on 6 February 1858 in Halberstadt, Germany. In 1877, he joined the family business, metal trading company Aron Hirsch & Sohn, founded by the grandfather Aron Hirsch (1783–1842), in Halberstadt. In 1898, he moved to Berlin to take over the management of the Eberswalder Messingwerk after the death of his uncle Gustav Hirsch. In 1906 he joined the :de:Gesellschaft der Freunde (Society of Friends). In 1907, Aron Hirsch & Sohn discontinued its industrial activities and incorporated them into the newly founded company Hirsch Kupfer- und Messingwerke AG (HKM), Berlin, which went public in 1909 where he served as chairman of the board and shareholder.

He became a member of the management board of the Berlin Stock Exchange and served on numerous supervisory boards, including Deutsche Bank. During the First World War, HKM profited due to German armaments orders but simultaneously lost money as their overseas raw material base was expropriated by Germany's war opponents. In 1929, the Imperial Chemical Industries (ICI) took over the firm's industrial activities and the trading house was subsumed by Handelshaus H. Schoyer.

Hirsch was involved in the Hochschule für die Wissenschaft des Judentums (the Academy for the Science of Judaism) and in the Berlin Jewish community. In 1922 he received an honorary doctorate from the Technische Universität Darmstadt. He was married to Amalie "Mally" Hirsch (b. Mainz d. 1865 in Frankfurt); they had two children: Siegmund Hirsch (1885–1981) and Dora "Dodo" Hirsch Schwartz (d. 1893). In 1932, Hirsch retired to Wiesbaden with his wife and initially lived in the Hotel Nassauer Hof. Due to the increasing persecution after the rise of the National Socialists and their seizure of power in 1933, the couple was forced to continuously relocate. Aron Hirsch died on 22 February 1942, in Wiesbaden; his wife Amalie committed suicide on 27 August 1942, shortly after it was announced that she would be deported to the Theresienstadt concentration camp.

References

 Friedrich von Borries/ Jens-Uwe Fischer: Heimatcontainer. Deutsche Fertighäuser in Israel. Frankfurt/ Main: Suhrkamp, 2009.
 Anett Krause, Cordula Reuß [Hrsg.]: NS-Raubgut in der Universitätsbibliothek Leipzig : [Katalog zur Ausstellung in der Bibliotheca Albertina, 27. November 2011 bis 18. März 2012]. Universitätsbibliothek Leipzig, Schriften aus der Universitätsbibliothek Leipzig ; 25 , 2011 , S. 63ff
 Joseph Walk (Hrsg.), Kurzbiographien zur Geschichte der Juden 1918–1945. hrsg. vom Leo Baeck Institute, Jerusalem. München : Saur, 1988 .
 Walter Tetzlaff, 2000 Kurzbiographien bedeutender deutscher Juden des 20. Jahrhunderts, Askania-Verlag, Lindhorst 1982, 
 Ernst G. Lowenthal: Juden in Preussen, Berlin : Reimer , 1982 
 Salomon Wininger: Große jüdische National-Biographie. Kraus Reprint, Nendeln 1979,  (Nachdr. d. Ausg. Czernowitz 1925).
 

German industrialists
19th-century German Jews
1858 births
1942 deaths
German businesspeople in metals
German commodities traders